Thomas Sydney Battersby (18 November 1887 – 3 September 1974) was an English competition swimmer who represented Great Britain in freestyle events at two consecutive Olympic Games.

At the 1908 Summer Olympics hosted by London, he won a silver medal in the men's 1500-metre freestyle, finishing second with a time of 22:51.2, behind fellow Briton Henry Taylor (22:48.4), and ahead of Australian Frank Beaurepaire (22:56.2).  He also advanced to the semifinals in the 400-metre freestyle.

Four years later at the 1912 Summer Olympics in Stockholm, Sweden, Battersby won a bronze medal as a member of the third-place British men's team in the 4×200-metre relay.  He also reached the semifinals of the 400-metre freestyle and 1500-metre freestyle.

During the course of his competitive swimming career, Battersby set four world records in freestyle events, including the 400-metre, 330-yard, 440-yard and one-mile distances.  Battersby had a reputation for physical toughness; at the 1908 Olympics, he continued to swim at the end of the 1500-metre event – a shorter distance than the imperial mile – in an attempt to break the world record for the mile freestyle.  He fell short of breaking the world record, but did set a new British national mark.

He was born in Platt Bridge, near Wigan, Lancashire, England, and died in Sydney, New South Wales, Australia.  He was posthumously inducted into the International Swimming Hall of Fame as an "Honor Swimmer" in 2007.

See also
 List of members of the International Swimming Hall of Fame
 List of Olympic medalists in swimming (men)
 World record progression 400 metres freestyle

References

External links
British Olympic Association profile 

1887 births
1974 deaths
English male freestyle swimmers
World record setters in swimming
Olympic bronze medalists in swimming
Olympic bronze medallists for Great Britain
Olympic silver medallists for Great Britain
Olympic swimmers of Great Britain
Sportspeople from Wigan
People from Wigan
Swimmers at the 1908 Summer Olympics
Swimmers at the 1912 Summer Olympics
Medalists at the 1912 Summer Olympics
Medalists at the 1908 Summer Olympics
Olympic silver medalists in swimming